Genda Shigyō is a Japanese paper production company which has produced ceremonial paper goods such as mizuhiki, gift wrapping and betrothal gifts since 771. It is often known as one of the oldest still-operating companies in the world.

History 
Genda Shigyō was said to have been founded in 771 (Hogame 2) during the Nara period (710-794). Moved to Kyoto with the relocation of the capital to Heian period (794-1192). In the late Edo period, the Genda family took over the business of Zenbe Yagiya and it became Yagizen Genda Shoten. The company supplied mizuhiki to the Imperial Palace until the Meiji Era, when mizuhiki became popular among the general public. In 1986, Genda Shigyo Co. Ltd. was engaged in the manufacture of mizuhiki until the prewar period at its current location, and now handles the wholesale and printing of products using mizuhiki, ceremonial goods such as yuzuna (betrothal gifts), and other paper products.

See also
 List of oldest companies

References

External links
 

Pulp and paper companies of Japan